Peroxydiphosphoric acid (H4P2O8) is an oxyacid of phosphorus. Its salts are known as peroxydiphosphates. It is one of two peroxyphosphoric acids, along with peroxymonophosphoric acid.

History 
Both peroxyphosphoric acids were first synthesized and characterized in 1910 by Julius Schmidlin and Paul Massini, where peroxydiphosphoric acid was obtained in poor yields from the reaction between diphosphoric acid and highly-concentrated hydrogen peroxide.

 H4P2O7 + H2O2 -> H4P2O8 + H2O

Preparation 
Peroxydiphosphoric acid can be prepared by the reaction between phosphoric acid and fluorine, with peroxymonophosphoric acid being a by-product.

 2H3PO4 + F2 -> H4P2O8 + 2HF

The compound is not commercially available and must be prepared as needed. Peroxodiphosphates can be obtained by electrolysis of phosphate solutions.

Properties 
Peroxydiphosphoric acid is a tetraprotic acid, with acid dissociation constants given by pKa1 ≈ −0.3, pKa2 ≈ 0.5, pKa3 = 5.2 and pKa4 = 7.6. In aqueous solution, it disproportionates upon heating to peroxymonophosphoric acid and phosphoric acid.

 H4P2O8 + H2O <=> H3PO5 + H3PO4

References 

Phosphorus oxoacids
Mineral acids